The Songbirds of Pain is a story collection by Garry Kilworth published in 1984.

Plot summary
The Songbirds of Pain is a collection of 13 science fiction short stories.

Reception
Dave Langford reviewed The Songbirds of Pain for White Dwarf #60, and stated that "Amid Kilworth's exotic settings, 'ordinary' and 'fantastic' aspects fuse in a blaze of style. Try it."

Reviews
Review by Chris Morgan (1985) in Fantasy Review, January 1985
Review by Nigel Richardson (1985) in Vector 124/125

References

1984 short story collections
Science fiction short story collections
Victor Gollancz Ltd books